Born lake is a lake in Lozère, France, located on the Aubrac plateau.  It has an elevation of 1260 m (the highest lake of the plateau). Its surface area is 0.05 km2. It has a glacial origin like the other lakes located in this area (St Andéol, Souveyrols, Salhiens)

Born